Xyliphius is a genus of banjo catfishes from South America.

This genus appears to be widespread in the Magdalena, Orinoco, Amazon, and Paraguay-Paraná River systems where they are most common in deeper waters.

Xyliphius includes moderately sized aspredinids, ranging from 8.8–14.7 centimetres (3.5–5.8 in) SL. Species of this genus are distinguished from all other aspredinids by having highly reduced eyes, toothless premaxillae, a row of fleshy papillae projecting anteriorly off the lower lip, flattened unculi and unculiferous tubercles flattened. These species also have the openings of the anterior nares with papillae and no dark saddles on the body.

Species
There are currently seven described species in this genus:
 Xyliphius anachoretes C. A. A. de Figueiredo & Britto, 2010
 Xyliphius barbatus Alonso de Arámburu & Arámburu, 1962
 Xyliphius kryptos Taphorn & Lilyestrom, 1983
 Xyliphius lepturus Orcés-V. (es), 1962
 Xyliphius lombarderoi F. J. J. Risso & E. N. P. de Risso, 1964
 Xyliphius magdalenae C. H. Eigenmann, 1912
 Xyliphius melanopterus Orcés-V. (es), 1962

References

Aspredinidae
Catfish genera
Freshwater fish genera
Catfish of South America
Freshwater fish of South America
Taxa named by Carl H. Eigenmann